Te Arai is a small community on the east coast of the North Island of New Zealand, near the northern end of the Auckland Region (specifically within the former Rodney District). Mangawhai lies to the north, and Tomarata to the south. The name of the suburb comes from Tāhuhunui-o-te-rangi, captain of the Moekākara waka, who landed here and set up a temporary shelter (arai). Tāhuhunui-o-te-rangi was later buried at Te Arai.

Te Arai Beach is a sandy bottom beach and is a very popular surfing destination, rated one of the best surf locations in the Auckland region.  3 new golf courses have been built in the region named Te Arai Links and Tara Iti. 

Tourism and farming are the predominant activities in the area. Among the bird species found here is the critically endangered New Zealand fairy tern, of which only 11 breeding pairs are left in the world. Auckland Council owns Te Arai Regional Park.

Te Arai Beach is the exact antipode of Gibraltar.

References

External links
 Te Arai Regional Park
 Save Te Arai- a group of locals opposing the proposed development of Te Arai beach.
 Visit Wellsford- explore Te Arai - Visit Wellsford website.

Populated places in the Auckland Region
Rodney Local Board Area